Michael Vaillancourt Aris (27 March 1946 – 27 March 1999) was a Cuban-born English historian who wrote and lectured on Bhutanese, Tibetan and Himalayan culture and history. He was the husband of Aung San Suu Kyi, who would later become State Counsellor of Myanmar.

Life
Aris was born in Havana, Cuba, son of British Council officer John Arundel Aris ​and Josette, daughter of Emile Vaillancourt, Canadian Ambassador to Cuba.

He was educated at Worth School in Sussex, and read modern history at Durham University, where he was a member of St Cuthbert's Society. After graduating in 1967, he spent six years as a private tutor to the children of the Bhutanese royal family.

In 1976, Aris moved on to the University of Oxford and became a junior research fellow and a member of the university faculty at St John's College. In 1978, he obtained a Ph.D. in Tibetan literature from the University of London. Later at St Antony's College, Oxford, he became a senior research fellow at the Asian Studies Centre. In the last years before his death, he helped establish a specialist Tibetan and Himalayan  studies centre at Oxford.

Michael Aris's identical twin brother, Anthony Aris, similarly became a scholar of Tibetan studies, and founded Serindia Publications to focus on bringing Tibetan history and culture to modern audiences.

Relationship with Aung San Suu Kyi
In 1972, Aris married Aung San Suu Kyi, whom he had met while at the university. They married in a Buddhist ceremony. After spending a year in Bhutan, they settled in North Oxford, where they raised their two sons, Alexander Aris and Kim Aris. During this time, he did postgraduate studies at the School of Oriental and African Studies, University of London and obtained a PhD in Tibetan literature in 1978. In 1988, Aung San Suu Kyi returned to Burma at first to care for her mother but later to lead the country's pro-democracy movement. St John's College provided Aris with an extended leave of absence as a fellow on full stipend so that he could lobby for his wife's cause.

In 1997, Aris was diagnosed with prostate cancer which was later found to be terminal. Several countries, prominent individuals and organisations, including the United States government, United Nations Secretary-General Kofi Annan and Pope John Paul II, made appeals to the Burmese authorities to allow Dr Aris a visa. The Burmese government would not grant him a visa to visit Burma, saying that they did not have the facilities to care for him, and instead urged Aung San Suu Kyi to leave the country to visit him. She was at that time temporarily free from house arrest but was unwilling to depart, fearing that she would be refused re-entry if she left, as she did not trust the junta's assurance that she could return.

After 1989, when his wife was first placed under house arrest, and until his death in 1999, he had seen her only five times, the last of which was for Christmas in 1995, after Suu Kyi had been released for the first time.

Death
Aris died of prostate cancer on his 53rd birthday in 1999, in Oxford.

Publications
 Freedom from Fear and Other Writings: Revised Edition (Paperback) by Aung San Suu Kyi (Author), Václav Havel (Foreword), Desmond M. Tutu (Foreword), Michael Aris (Editor). Penguin (Non-Classics); Rev Sub edition (1 March 1996). .
 Tibetan Studies in Honor of Hugh Richardson. Edited by Michael Aris and Aung San Suu Kyi. Preface by Michael Aris. (1979). Vikas Publishing house, New Delhi.
 "Notes on the History of the Mon-yul Corridor." In: * Tibetan Studies in Honour of Hugh Richardson, pp. 9–20. Edited by Michael Aris and Aung San Suu Kyi. (1979). Vikas Publishing house, New Delhi.
 Hidden Treasures and Secret Lives: A Study of Pemalingpa (1450–1521) and the Sixth Dalai Lama (1683–1706) (1450–1521 and the Sixth Dalai Lama). Kegan Paul; 1st edition (May 1989). .
 The Raven Crown: The Origins of Buddhist Monarchy in Bhutan (Hardcover). Serindia Publications (1 October 2005). .
 Lamas, Princes, and Brigands: Joseph Rock's Photographs of the Tibetan Borderlands of China. Joseph F. Rock (Author), Michael Aris (Editor). 1st edition 1982. Reprint: China House Gallery. China Institute in America (June 1992). .
 Bhutan, the Early History of a Himalayan Kingdom. (Aris & Phillips Central Asian Studies) (Paperback). Aris & Phillips (May 1979). .
 Views of Medieval Bhutan: The Diary and Drawings of Samuel Davis 1783 (Hardcover). Roli Books International (1982).
 High Peaks, Pure Earth: Collected Writings on Tibetan History and Culture (Paperback) by Hugh Richardson (Author), Michael Aris (Author). Serindia Publications (October 1998). .
 Ceremonies of the Lhasa Year (Heritage of Tibet) (Paperback) by Hugh Richardson (Author), Michael Aris (Editor). Serindia Publications (June 1994). .
 Sources for the history of Bhutan (Wiener Studien zur Tibetologie und Buddhismuskunde) (Unknown Binding). Arbeitskreis für Tibetische und Buddhistische Studien, Universität Wien (1986).
 Tibetan studies and resources in Oxford. (6 pages only – unknown publisher and binding)

References

Tibetologists
1946 births
1999 deaths
Alumni of St Cuthbert's Society, Durham
Fellows of St Antony's College, Oxford
Fellows of St John's College, Oxford
People from Oxford
Deaths from prostate cancer
Deaths from cancer in England
People educated at Worth School
English twins
Identical twins
20th-century British historians
Writers from Havana
Aung San Suu Kyi
British people of Canadian descent